Tesla, Inc. has been criticized for its cars, workplace culture, business practices, and occupational safety. Many of the company's criticisms are also directed toward Elon Musk, the company's CEO and Product Architect. Critics have also accused Tesla of deceptive marketing, unfulfilled promises, and fraud, with Elon Musk usually included as well. The company is currently facing criminal and civil investigations into its self-driving claims. Critics have highlighted Tesla's downplaying of issues, and Tesla's alleged retaliation against several whistleblowers.

The safety and quality of Tesla cars and services have been questioned against the company's claims. There have been hundreds of reports of sudden unintended acceleration, brake failures, and "whompy wheels" – collapsing wheels due to faulty car suspension. These safety and quality problems have been compounded by the poor wait times of Tesla's customer service. Some features such as Autopilot, Full Self-Driving beta, and Passenger Play (a feature allowing riders to play Tesla games while in motion) have been criticized for their careless deployment. Critics have noted that some Tesla cars have had poor build quality due to rushed testing, leading to a high ratio of flawed vehicles. Others criticized the company's "stealth" vehicle recalls, requiring customers to sign non-disclosure agreements and intentional disregard about vehicles' fire risk.

Relationships between Elon Musk, Tesla board members, employees, and unions have been complicated, partly resulting in a high turnover rate. Musk has been noted for his erratic behavior, dispute of his founder title, and overpromises. Employees have reported poor treatment and policies, resulting in a high injury rate, with some having faced sexual harassment, racism, and union-busting incidents. Tesla's environmental practices, use of cryptocurrencies, and compliance with open source licenses have been mentioned by critics. Detractors also claim that Tesla and Musk's public relations activities have been used to deflect criticisms.

Musk and his company have been frequently accused of engaging in fraud, such as in their buyout of SolarCity, selling defective vehicles, overpromising, and posting reckless tweets. One tweet resulted in Musk agreeing to pay a fine and step down as Tesla's chairman. Proponents and opponents of Tesla have accused each other of conflict of interests, believing Tesla's stock valuation is either under- or overvalued.

Fraud allegations

SolarCity buyout 

The so-described "SolarCity debacle" led a group of Tesla shareholders to file a lawsuit alleging Musk breached his fiduciary duties and unjustly enriched himself in Tesla's buyout of SolarCity in 2016. The shareholders claim that Musk knew SolarCity was going broke before the buyout, that Musk failed to properly recuse himself from the deal-making process, and that the deal was, in effect, a bailout of Musk's cousins Peter and Lyndon Rive. In order to gain shareholder support for the buyout, Musk unveiled the Solar Roof in October 2016, but the Solar Roof tiles that Musk displayed were later revealed to be fake. The trial was held in July 2021. The court ruled in Musk's favor in April 2022 and has been appealed. Lawyers and legal academics criticized the ruling as a mistake.

Tesla was sued along with SolarCity in July 2018 for SolarCity allegedly firing three employees improperly after they blew the whistle on fraudulent sales records at the company. In June 2020, the lawsuit was dismissed with prejudice.

"Funding secured" 

In September 2018, the U.S. Securities and Exchange Commission (SEC) charged Musk with securities fraud for his "false and misleading" statements after tweeting that he had "funding secured" to take Tesla private.  The SEC also charged Tesla with failing to have adequate controls and procedures in place regarding Musk's tweets.

Musk settled the fraud charges with the SEC in 2018, agreeing to pay a $20 million fine and stepping down as Tesla's chairman. Tesla also agreed to pay a $20 million fine and put in place additional controls to oversee Musk's communications.

According to The Wall Street Journal, the SEC told Tesla in May 2020 that the company had failed "to enforce these procedures and controls despite repeated violations by Mr. Musk". A lawsuit filed in March 2021 alleges that Musk violated his fiduciary duty to Tesla by continuing to send "erratic" tweets in violation of the SEC settlement, and that the board has failed to control Musk. On April 1, 2022, a federal judge ruled that Musk "recklessly made the [2018] statements with knowledge as to their falsity". Comments made by Musk later in April 2022 disputing the factual basis of his settlement with the SEC likely violated the terms of the settlement agreement.

Accounting 
In 2017, a lawsuit alleged Tesla made materially false and misleading statements regarding its preparedness to produce Model 3 cars. The U.S. Department of Justice also began an investigation in 2018 into whether Tesla misled investors and misstated production figures about the Model 3. The lawsuit was dismissed in Tesla's favor in March 2019.

In November 2019, hedge fund manager David Einhorn accused Elon Musk of "significant fraud" and in April 2020, questioned Tesla's accounting, in particular their large accounts receivable balance. Later in 2020, numerous reporters and financial analysts speculated that Tesla could be the next Wirecard scandal.

Autopilot and Full Self-Driving fraud 
, Tesla is facing a criminal probe from the US Department of Justice over claims it has made about its "Full Self-Driving" driver-assist system or capability. The company has been criticized for selling and promoting its so-called Full Self-Driving (FSD) beta add-on, when in fact the software requires drivers' constant supervision and is not actually capable of full self-driving. Tesla's Full Self-Driving beta is generally considered a SAE Level 2 advanced driver-assistance system, similar to competitors' offerings such as General Motors' Super Cruise and Ford's Co-Pilot360. Legal scholars William Widen and Philip Koopman argue that Tesla has misrepresented FSD beta as SAE Level 2 in order to "avoid regulatory oversight and permitting processes required of more highly automated vehicles". They argue that FSD beta should actually be considered a SAE Level 4 technology, and have urged state Departments of Transportation in the U.S. to classify it as such, because publicly available videos show that "beta test drivers operate their vehicles as if to validate SAE Level 4 (high driving automation) features, often revealing dramatically risky situations created by use of the vehicles in this manner."

Tesla has benefited from increased sales and profit margins due to sales of the FSD option in particular, priced at $15,000 . In April 2019, when Tesla was low on capital, Musk announced that Tesla would have one million robotaxis on the road by the end of 2020; a few weeks later Tesla sold stock to raise an additional $3 billion, solving its cash troubles.

Elon Musk has repeatedly claimed that Tesla vehicles will be capable of full autonomy in the near future, but a Freedom of Information Act request made by PlainSite revealed that Tesla told the California Department of Motor Vehicles (DMV) in December 2020 they "do not expect significant enhancements" to the Full Self-Driving software that would enable full self-driving. In May 2021, the California DMV said it was investigating whether Tesla violated state regulations by misleading customers in its claims about "full self-driving". Bryant Walker Smith, an autonomous vehicle law expert at the University of South Carolina, said "it's so obviously clear that there's a contradiction" between what Tesla is saying in its marketing of Full Self-Driving versus what its lawyers and engineers have told the DMV. Smith said that using the name Full Self-Driving "leaves the domain of the misleading and irresponsible to something that could be called fraudulent". In August 2022, records surfaced showing that the California DMV had formally accused Tesla of false advertising Autopilot and FSD in July.

In Germany in July 2020, authorities ruled that Tesla misled consumers regarding the "abilities of its automated driving systems" and banned it from using certain marketing language implying autonomous driving capabilities. Upon appeal, that decision was reversed in 2021 by a higher court under the condition that Tesla clarify the capabilities of Autopilot on its website.

In a 2021 lawsuit against Tesla, Texas police officers claimed "systematic fraud" involving Tesla Autopilot after a Model X crashed into two parked police cars. , a trial has been requested. In September 2022, Tesla was sued by drivers in a proposed class action suit over alleged false advertising of Autopilot and FSD.

Reselling defective vehicles 
In mid 2020, Tesla was accused of reselling defective "lemon" cars in the U.S. and Europe, followed by accounts of Norway Tesla service centers using lemons as loaners. Multiple customers have accused Tesla of knowingly selling defective vehicles in China as well. In September 2021, a Chinese court ruled that Tesla had acted in a fraudulent manner by reselling a customer a defective used Model S car.

Safety issues

Autopilot 

Critics argue that Tesla has published misleading safety claims about its Autopilot driver-assistance system, and that Tesla cars are actually less safe with Autopilot activated. Tesla's "public beta" release of Autopilot has been called unsafe and irresponsible, as critical safety features aren't thoroughly tested before being released to consumers. The National Transportation Safety Board has criticized Tesla for neglecting driver safety, calling certain Autopilot features "completely inadequate", and cited Autopilot as the probable cause of multiple deadly crashes involving Tesla vehicles. A 2019 study found that Autosteer increased the odds of airbag deployment by a factor of 2.4. A 2020 study found that drivers were more distracted when they used Autopilot, and the researchers called on Tesla to take more steps to ensure drivers stay attentive. Another 2020 study identified significant inconsistencies, abnormalities, and unsafe behavior with Autopilot on three Tesla Model 3 cars. Numerous videos have shown misuse and apparent malfunctions of Autopilot leading to collisions, and between 2016 and 2022 at least fifteen fatalities have involved the use of Autopilot, nine of which occurred in the United States.

The Center for Auto Safety and Consumer Watchdog have criticized Tesla for what they believe are deceptive marketing practices related to Autopilot. Studies by AAA and the Insurance Institute for Highway Safety have shown the name "Autopilot" to be misleading, causing drivers to think the system is safer than it actually is. A German court ruled in 2020 that Tesla had misled consumers by using the terms "Autopilot" and "Full Self Driving".

As of March 2021, the NHTSA was investigating 23 recent accidents involving Tesla vehicles that may have been on Autopilot. Tesla's Autopilot technology has struggled to detect crossing traffic and stopped vehicles, including stationary emergency vehicles, which has led to multiple fatal crashes. (Tesla released an "Emergency Light Detection" over-the-air update to Autopilot in September 2021, and the NHTSA questioned why it didn't issue a recall.) Additionally, an MIT study published in September 2021 found that Tesla Autopilot is not as safe as it claims and leads to drivers becoming inattentive from regular use of the system.

In February 2022, NHTSA began an investigation of phantom braking at highway speeds after 354 complaints from customers concerning a group of about 416,000 Tesla vehicles. The complaints describe rapid deceleration that can occur repeatedly without warning and apparently at random. One owner of a 2021 Tesla Model Y reported a violent deceleration to the NHTSA from 80 mph to 69 mph in less than a second. In May 2022, the NHTSA said in a letter that they had received over 750 complaints about this issue.

In June 2022, NHTSA announced it was investigating 16 instances in which Autopilot shut off less than a second before a collision. Fortune suggested this "might indicate the system was designed to shut off when it sensed an imminent accident". Fortune also pointed out that Musk has frequently claimed that "accidents cannot be the fault of the company, as data it extracted invariably showed Autopilot was not active in the moment of the collision". Senator Ed Markey praised the NHTSA investigation, criticizing Tesla for disregarding safety rules and misleading the public about its "Autopilot" system.

Full Self-Driving 
Tesla has also been criticized by industry observers and safety advocates for its "fast-and-loose approach" to developing its automated-driving technology. Critics argue that pedestrians, cyclists, and other drivers didn't sign up to take part in Tesla's "lab experiment" of testing Full Self Driving with amateur drivers on public roads. In July 2021, many videos surfaced showing dangerous behavior in Tesla vehicles using the latest version of the Full Self Driving add-on.

Tesla initially required all customers to sign a non-disclosure agreement in order to take part in their so-called FSD Beta testing program, which journalists noted as an attempt by Tesla to hide the system's flaws and protect itself from critics who argue that Tesla is actually making roads more dangerous. In response, the NHTSA sent a formal letter to Tesla asking about the terms of the NDA. Since then, videos of incidents from many beta testers have been posted online. Billionaire software safety advocate Dan O'Dowd aired a commercial claiming to show a Tesla running over child-sized mannequins several times; this generated a cease-and-desist letter from Tesla, which O'Dowd dismissed.

In August 2022, consumer rights activist Ralph Nader called on the NHTSA to outright remove Full Self-Driving from all applicable Tesla cars. Vice and Consumer Reports also noted the poor implementation of Tesla's "Safety Score" measurement, which has led to drivers taking unsafe actions such as not braking for cyclists in the hopes of increasing their safety scores.

In February 2022, Tesla agreed to remove a "rolling stop" option from the add-on after the National Highway Traffic Safety Administration complained the practice is unsafe and illegal everywhere in the United States.

Fire risk 

Leaked emails revealed that starting in 2012 Tesla knowingly sold Model S cars with a design flaw in its battery that could cause fires. Toyota ended their partnership with Tesla in 2014 in part because of disagreements about structural designs that could help prevent battery damage from road debris which could cause fires. Following a National Highway Traffic Safety Administration (NHTSA) investigation into two high-profile Tesla vehicle fires in 2014, Tesla added a titanium underbody shield to better protect the battery from road debris.

The NHTSA investigated Tesla in 2019 for allegedly issuing over-the-air updates to cover-up a non-crash fire risk in their batteries. In early 2021, Chinese regulators reprimanded Tesla after an increase in customer complaints about battery fires.

Sudden unintended acceleration 
Over 200 incidents of sudden unintended acceleration in Tesla vehicles were reviewed by the NHTSA following a defect petition filed in December 2019. The investor who filed the defect petition said that the number of sudden unintended acceleration incidents involving Tesla vehicles was "astonishingly high" compared to other vehicles. The NHTSA concluded in January 2021 that the incidents were the result of user error, due to drivers confusing the brake and accelerator pedals.

In June 2021, Chinese regulators announced that Tesla would recall nearly 300,000 China-made and imported Model 3 and Model Y cars due to an assisted driving function that could be activated accidentally, causing sudden unintended acceleration.

Brake failures 

In March 2021, the owner of a new Model 3 in China reported an accident that she believed was caused by a brake failure; a Tesla China technician reproduced the accident at the same location. Tesla China later issued a statement saying that both the customer's and the technician's cars showed no signs of any malfunction.

In April 2021, an angry Tesla owner protested atop a Tesla Model 3 at the Shanghai Auto Show, repeatedly yelling "Tesla brake lost control". The woman says that the brakes on her Tesla Model 3 failed, nearly killing four of her family members in an accident. Tesla China disputed the claim, saying the car's brakes and emergency-warning system functioned properly.

Stealth recalls 
Tesla has been accused of performing "stealth recalls" by labeling safety-critical repairs as "goodwill", while also requiring customers to sign non-disclosure agreements. Journalist and author Ed Niedermeyer called this type of agreement "unheard of in the auto industry", and noted that a policy of demanding non-disclosure agreements for "goodwill" repairs would limit the number of defects Tesla owners reported to the NHTSA. The NHTSA stated they were aware that Tesla had entered into a "troublesome" non-disclosure agreement with one Model S owner regarding a failed suspension.

Misleading safety ratings 

In 2013, the NHTSA awarded the original Tesla Model S its maximum safety rating of five stars. Tesla subsequently claimed that - based on the details of the test - it actually achieved 5.4 stars, prompting the NHTSA to release a statement reaffirming that it does not award more than five stars, and that Tesla was "misleading the public" by claiming in their marketing that the NHTSA had awarded them a higher rating.

In 2017, the Insurance Institute for Highway Safety (IIHS) awarded the Model S their second-highest rating of "acceptable," denying the Model S a "Top Safety Pick" rating due to less than satisfactory results in a frontal overlap crash test of the vehicle and its "poor" headlights. Tesla responded by accusing groups like the IIHS of using methods "that suit their own subjective purposes", and dismissed the results by claiming that the Model S and Model X were "the safest cars in history" based on the NHTSA's older and less comprehensive tests. Reporters noted Tesla's dismissiveness of potential safety concerns, calling it "irresponsible" and "ridiculous."

In 2018, after the Tesla Model 3 was awarded a five-star rating by the NHTSA, Tesla claimed that the Model 3 had "the lowest probability of injury of any vehicle ever tested by NHTSA," prompting the NHTSA to publish a statement that it does not rank vehicles within the five-star category. In 2019, documents acquired by PlainSite revealed that the NHTSA had sent Elon Musk a cease and desist letter in response to this and several other "deceptive" and "inaccurate" statements about the NHTSA's ratings which were made by Tesla and promoted on social media by Musk. The NHTSA then referred the matter to the U.S. Federal Trade Commission's Bureau of Consumer Protection for further investigation.

"Whompy wheels" 

Starting in 2015, many Tesla drivers have complained about "whompy wheels"—an issue where the car's suspension system breaks, sometimes causing a wheel to collapse or fall off the car. Rather than issue a recall on potentially defective suspensions, Tesla has released multiple technical service bulletins warning mechanics about suspension issues. In October 2020, Chinese authorities forced Tesla to recall 30,000 Model S and X cars due to the suspension issue.

Passenger Play 
In December 2021, National Highway Traffic Safety Administration opened an investigation into Tesla's Passenger Play feature, which allowed riders to play games on the car's touchscreen even while the vehicle was in motion. The agency's inquiry included four models - S, X, Y and 3. A day after the investigation was officially launched, Tesla responded with an over-the-air update that disabled Passenger Play for vehicles in motion and making it only accessible while the car is parked. However, NHTSA stated it will continue with the investigation.

Musk's promises 

According to Bethany McLean, skeptics have come to see Elon Musk's attempts at promoting Tesla as "more unhinged than iconoclastic", and noted his "penchant for making grandiose statements that he either knows are not true at the time he makes them, or that he has no real intent of following through on." Other critics go further and characterize Musk's overpromising as "unethical" or manipulative in order to "raise capital, collect customer deposits, or secure regulatory benefits." Musk has made numerous promises about Tesla that have failed to come true, including:

 From 2014 to 2022, Musk has promised some form of full self-driving "next year" each year. Musk said in 2015 that he did not think making fully autonomous cars was very difficult, and predicted "complete autonomy" by 2018.  Starting in at least 2019, Musk has claimed that Tesla vehicles are capable of "full self-driving", but Tesla's Autopilot is only a Level 2 advanced driver-assistance system, requiring drivers to maintain full attention and be prepared to take control of the vehicle at a moment's notice. In 2019, Musk said that Tesla would have more than 1 million robotaxis on the road in 2020, and sold a "Full Self-Driving capability" package, despite the technology not yet being available. Experts stated the 2020 prediction was unrealistic and Tesla had no chance of achieving it. In April 2020, Musk admitted that "punctuality is not my strong suit" and robotaxis in some form could be in operation sometime in 2021, which they did not. In 2021, Tesla was ranked last for both strategy and execution in the autonomous driving sector by Guidehouse Insights.
 Musk claimed in 2016 that the Nevada Gigafactory would be a net zero-emissions facility, running on 100% renewable energy from solar panels covering the factory's roof. The Gigafactory needs at least 300 megawatts of power, but , Tesla has only 8 megawatts of solar panels on the Gigafactory roof.
In 2018, Musk conceded that his 2016 plan for "excessive automation at Tesla was a mistake." Tesla ended up building some of its Model 3 cars in a tent using mostly manual labor who used shortcuts.
Musk said that 2019 would be the "year of the solar roof," and was hoping Tesla would manufacture 1,000 roofs a week by the end of the year. Publications estimated that solar roofs were installed on less than 100 homes and challenged his prediction. Then, in June 2020, Tesla cancelled many customers' orders for solar roof installations, saying they were outside of their service area. Customers complained about being upset with this decision since they had placed $1,000 deposits for pre-orders as early as 2017. , about 23 roofs per week are being installed.
In 2021, it was reported CEOs of major automotive manufacturers had approached Tesla for electric vehicle technology that it was supposedly open to sharing and were instead offered the opportunity to purchase regulatory credits by Musk, suggesting that the company and Musk "may not be not as eager for the electric revolution to occur as [they claim]".

Whistleblower allegations and retaliation 
In June 2018, Martin Tripp, a former employee at Giga Nevada, leaked documents to Business Insider that indicated Tesla was generating excessive amounts of waste and scrap material, which cost Tesla nearly $150 million for the first half of 2018. According to Bloomberg, after determining that Tripp was the source of this leak, Elon Musk set out to "destroy" him. A former Tesla security manager, Sean Gouthro, described a months-long campaign by Tesla to "hound" and harass Tripp, including hacking into Tripp's phone and having him followed by investigators. On June 20, the same day that Tesla sued Tripp for $167 million, an anonymous caller contacted Tesla and claimed that Tripp was planning a mass shooting at the Gigafactory. Police found Tripp unarmed and determined the threat was not credible; Tripp suggested the fake tip may have been made by Musk himself. The court ruled in Tesla's favor on September 17, 2020, though questions remain about the wasted materials and why they were left unaccounted for in corporate reports.

Also in June 2018, a former high-level safety official at Tesla named Carlos Ramirez sued the company for failing to treat injured workers and misclassifying worker injuries to avoid reporting them to authorities. Ramirez alleged that he was fired by Tesla in retaliation for raising concerns about these practices. , the case is unresolved.

In August 2018, a former Tesla employee named Karl Hansen filed a whistleblower complaint with the SEC alleging that Tesla failed to disclose an alleged drug trafficking ring at the Nevada Gigafactory "involving the sale of significant quantities of cocaine and possibly crystal methamphetamine" for a Mexican drug cartel. Hansen also accused Tesla of spying on employees and hiding the theft of $37 million worth of copper and other raw materials. Hansen alleged that he was retaliated against and wrongfully terminated by Tesla for raising these issues internally. In 2019, Hansen filed a lawsuit related to these allegations; in 2020, the case was ordered to arbitration. In June 2022, the arbitrator filed an unopposed motion with the court stating Hansen "has failed to establish the claims...Accordingly his claims are denied, and he shall take nothing". In 2019, former factory supervisor Lynn Thompson also sued Tesla for terminating his security contract after he reported the same theft to local authorities. Thompson said that Elon Musk and other high-level company executives met to discuss the thefts. In 2020, the case lawsuit was stayed pending arbitration.

In November 2020, a former Tesla employee named Steven Henkes filed a lawsuit alleging he was fired by Tesla in retaliation for raising safety concerns about "unacceptable fire risks" in the company's solar installations. Tesla solar installations have caught fire at seven Walmart locations, as well as an Amazon warehouse and Tesla attempted to correct some installations in secret. , the case is unresolved.

Misuse of government subsidies 
Tesla has been accused of gaming the California Air Resources Board system for zero-emission vehicle credits by launching a "battery swap" program that was never made available to the public. In 2018, the state of Oregon reclaimed $13 million from Tesla after an investigation found that SolarCity had falsely inflated the prices on 14 large-scale solar projects in 2010–2014 by over 100% in order to qualify for higher tax credits.

Since 2019, Tesla has sold a 94-mile range Model 3 in Canada in order to thwart their limits on electric vehicle tax incentives, which has cost Canadian taxpayers C$115 million. Aaron Wudrick, director of the Canadian Taxpayers Federation, accused Tesla of gaming the system by listing the no-frills model one dollar below the program's cut-off price of C$45,000. As of October 2020, Tesla had sold only 126 of the base model, versus 12,000 of the higher-end Standard Range Plus. Wudrick said, "Tesla and their wealthier customers are making off like bandits at taxpayers' expense."

Tesla has faced significant criticism regarding its Giga New York factory, which was built and equipped using nearly $1 billion in New York taxpayer money. Allegations in 2018 and 2019 include inflated job promises, cost overruns, construction delays, and a lack of effort from Musk.

Many observers have criticized Musk and Tesla's dependence on government subsidies. Critics have argued that these subsidies are inefficient and inequitable, as they go mainly to high-income households. As of 2015, Musk's companies Tesla, SolarCity, and SpaceX benefited from an estimated $4.9 billion in government subsidies. In December 2020, journalist Jacob Silverman in The New Republic accused Tesla and Musk of "grifting the government" and getting "unimaginably rich by maximally gaming the government's largesse".

Fandom 
Tesla has been noted for having an especially loyal and devoted fanbase, which has been likened to a cult, in particular a cult of personality around Elon Musk. According to Vice, there are "quasi-religious overtones" in any debate about Tesla. Ed Niedermeyer characterizes the culture that Tesla has fostered as "ambitious, aggressive, ruthless, defensive, and unapologetic" and has speculated that Musk orchestrated a "hype campaign" to gain fans and positive media coverage.

Tesla's loyal fan base has frequently turned toxic, attacking critics with "relentless fervor" while focused on harassing female journalists. An account in the Detroit Free Press illustrated the serious threats made by fans to a fellow Tesla owner and videoblogger for praising the Ford Mustang Mach-E. Scientist and engineer Missy Cummings was also the subject of personal harassment by Tesla advocates following the announcement of her joining the NHTSA as a senior advisor. Jennifer Homendy, head of the National Transportation Safety Board, said that the attacks against Cummings were a calculated attempt to distract from safety questions regarding Tesla's driver-assist and "full self-driving" technologies. Separately, Tesla fans became the subject of ridicule themselves after several fans independently tested Autopilot's automated braking system using children and homemade child-like dummies. Videos of some of the tests were later removed from YouTube for violating their child endangerment policy.

An article from Deutschlandfunk describes how "online armies take on defense work and information policy for Elon Musk" via tech blogs and social media. In addition, Tesla's clean-energy division Tesla Energy is alleged to have a team dedicated to searching for customer complaints on social media and asking them to delete their comments. A separate team is dedicated to managing negative social media posts aimed specifically at Elon Musk. Electrek, the largest electric car news site, has consistently promoted Tesla and has been accused of failing to disclose its conflicts of interest and close relationship with Tesla. Researchers found 186 bot accounts on Twitter that have consistently published positive sentiments about Tesla, which they say "may have buffered the Tesla narrative from an emergent group of critics, relieved downward pressure on the Tesla stock price and amplified pro-Tesla sentiment from the time of the firm's IPO in June 2010 to the end of 2020."

Environmental practices 

In June 2019, Ed Niedermeyer reported that Tesla showed a pattern of "chronic noncompliance that stands in stark contrast to Tesla's public image as an environmental crusader" as related to air quality permits at Tesla's Fremont factory. Tesla repeatedly ignored air quality regulations, receiving notices from the Bay Area Air Quality Management District for 21 permit deviations.

Tesla launched its Supercharger network in 2012 with the promise that its stations would be solar-powered, and only in 2021 did Tesla state the network power was 100% renewable, but through solar power on-site and through purchasing electricity which was matched to renewable generation. Despite the company's anti-carbon and anti-oil messaging, some Supercharger stations used diesel generators for backup power in 2015.

Tesla's 2018 impact report was criticized for not disclosing details on its emissions or electricity consumption, though emissions are rising as they expand in China and India. Tesla's 2021 impact report was criticized for not disclosing enough about how their operations affect the environment.

Quality issues 
Many critics, including Consumer Reports, J.D. Power, and What Car?, have noted the questionable quality and poor reliability of Tesla cars. For 2021, Consumer Reports rated Tesla's overall reliability as 27th worst out of 28 car brands. For 2022, Consumer Reports expects the reliability of the Model 3 to be average, and the Model S, X, and Y to be below average.

Tesla used non-automotive grade materials in their 2012 and later Model S infotainment screens in order to have the largest car screen on the market, but they distorted over time. Tesla skipped pre-production testing before the Model 3 launch in 2017, which other major auto manufacturers consider a crucial part of the quality control process. Tesla's production of the Model 3 was criticized in 2018 for producing an abnormally high ratio of flawed vehicles and parts. Jonathon Klein, reporting for The Drive, argued in 2019 that many of Tesla's quality problems stem from their cars being "rushed to market". For example, Tesla skipped a critical brake-and-roll test and reduced the number of welds on the Model 3 in order to meet quarterly production targets in 2018. Tesla vehicles have experienced noteworthy issues such as the roof detaching while driving on the highway in 2020. In September 2020, Model Y owners reported finding its cooling system to be held together with a "band-aid" of tape and faux wood. One manufacturing engineer in 2021 called an issue with Tesla vehicles having loose or missing suspension bolts "especially scary", since it indicates that Tesla does not have proper preventative measures in place to make sure parts are not missing. In early 2023, the steering wheel of a brand new Tesla fell off during driving, closely reflecting a similar case from 2020. Chinese regulators rebuked Tesla in early 2021, urging them to strengthen their internal management in order to improve quality control after growing consumer complaints amidst Tesla's rapid sales expansion in China.

Recalls have become a recurring matter for the company as well: In February 2021, Tesla was forced to recall 135,000 Model S and Model X vehicles built between 2012 and 2018 due to using a flash memory device that was only rated to last five to six years and, between November 2021 and February 2022, there were eight recalls across models for various issues (some involving safety concerns).

German Technical Inspection Association 2022 Report 

In the 2022 the German Technical Inspection Association (Technischer Überwachungsverein or TÜV) evaluated passenger cars whose main inspections took place between July 2020 and June 2021, and did its first-ever evaluation of the four most popular electric cars in Germany, with their defect rates:

With a defect rate of 10.7 percent, every tenth Tesla Model S failed the inspection and the Model S would end up in the bottom third of the 128 internal combustion engine (ICE) cars TÜV evaluated. The General German Automobile Club states the average defect rate for 2-3 year-old ICE cars is 4.7 percent.

Customer service issues 

In 2017, certain Tesla vehicles equipped with its Ludicrous performance mode had limited power output, as discovered by some Tesla owners in 2017. The power limits were connected to how frequently the drivers used Launch Mode; if a driver used it too much, the car's power output was restricted to prevent excessive wear and tear on components. Customers complained and the company removed the limiter.

Tesla owners complained in 2019 about "nightmarish" repair delays, with some car owners waiting upwards of six months for repairs due to long wait-times for parts and insufficient service centers. Customers also complained in 2019 about their inability to contact a human employee for service issues. Tesla has pushed customers to book service appointments via their mobile app, which one owner called a "black hole" in 2019. Customers complained in 2019 about Tesla being sloppy and inconsistent in handling returns and refunds, with some customers waiting months to receive refunds. In March 2021, Tesla double-charged some customers for new cars; about a week after significant public outcry, Tesla apologized and the customers received refunds.

In early 2020, Tesla was criticized by Chinese publications and individuals for delivering Model 3 cars with lower-performance Autopilot hardware than promised. Specifically, Tesla's Hardware Version 3.0 for Autopilot had been cited as being included when buyers bought the vehicles, but, upon closer examination, the new owners said the cars featured only Version 2.5 of the hardware.

Relations with the government of China 
Tesla has received special treatment and strong government support in China, gaining perks such as tax breaks, cheap financing, the ability to wholly own its Chinese operations, and assistance in building its Shanghai factory (Giga Shanghai) at breakneck speed. During the COVID-19 pandemic, according to Bloomberg, one Tesla executive said, "Tesla didn't just have a green light from the government to get back to work—it had a flashing-sirens police escort."

Musk has frequently praised China, a controversial stance due to deteriorating U.S.–Chinese relations, China's ongoing persecution of Uyghurs, and alleged human rights abuses in Hong Kong. James McGregor, chairman for Greater China at APCO Worldwide, said that foreign companies in China under Chinese Communist Party general secretary Xi Jinping need to "be aware that the ultimate plan is for all the advanced technologies to be Chinese." McGregor added, "I hope that Elon is going in there with both eyes open."

In August 2020, Congressional negotiators (led by then-U.S. Senator Cory Gardner) highlighted Tesla's ties to China as a potential national security risk for the United States.

In July 2021, Bloomberg Businessweek reported on Tesla's "fall from grace" in China due to data collection and safety issues. Tesla reportedly asked the Chinese government to censor criticism of Tesla on social media.

In January 2022, the Council on American–Islamic Relations, Senator Marco Rubio, and others urged Tesla to close its showroom in Ürümqi, Xinjiang, due to the ongoing Uyghur genocide in the Xinjiang region.

Working conditions 

In 2017, The Guardian published a story about working conditions at Tesla Fremont, in which former and current Tesla employees publicly expressed concerns about worker treatment. Between 2014 and 2017, ambulances went to Tesla Fremont over 100 times to provide emergency services to workers exhibiting symptoms including fainting, dizziness, abnormal breathing and chest pains resulting from the physically demanding tasks associated with their positions. At the end of that period, Tesla Fremont employed over 10,000 workers.

Underreported Total Recordable Incident Rate 
Tesla has acknowledged that its Total Recordable Incident Rate (TRIR, a measure of employee safety) exceeded the industry average between 2013 and 2016. Tesla did not release exact data over that period, claiming it is not representative of the factory's current operations. Musk defended Tesla's safety record and argued that the company had made significant improvement; in early 2017, Tesla added extra shifts and safety teams to improve conditions. However, when The Guardian reached out in 2017 to 15 current and/or former workers, each contradicted Musk's viewpoint. Jonathan Galescu, a production technician for the company, said, "I've seen people pass out, hit the floor like a pancake and smash their face open. They just send us to work around him while he's still laying on the floor." In February 2017, Jose Moran, a Tesla worker, blogged about the company's practices of mandatory overtime, frequent worker injuries and low wages. Both workers are involved with the United Auto Workers (UAW)'s current organizing campaign.

In 2018, The Center for Investigative Reporting's Reveal published an investigation concluding that Tesla under-counted worker injuries to make its safety record appear better. It included findings such as the factory floor not having clearly marked pedestrian lanes and instead having lanes painted different shades of gray because Elon Musk does not like the color yellow. In addition, other safety signals (such as signs and warning beeps) were lowered in order to please Musk's aesthetic preferences. Susan Rigmaiden, former environmental compliance manager, commented: "If someone said, 'Elon doesn't like something,' you were concerned because you could lose your job." Tesla called Reveal's investigation an "ideologically motivated attack by an extremist organization working directly with union supporters to create a calculated disinformation campaign against Tesla." Reveal responded by publishing the details of their investigation, which included interviews of more than three dozen current and former employees and managers as well as the review of hundreds of pages of documents. Additionally, many of the interviewed safety professionals had no involvement in a unionization effort. A California regulator (Cal/OSHA) confirmed the 2018 under-reporting and stated that including those injuries would raise Tesla's 2018 TRIR from 6.2 to 6.5, compared to the automobile manufacturing average of 6.1.

Injury policies criticized 
Tesla's policies for dealing with injured employees has been criticized. In 2017, workers alleged that Tesla's policies got in the way of workers reporting injuries. At Tesla, workers who reported injuries were moved to lighter work and also lower pay, while also being given access to supplemental insurance benefits. One injured worker reported that his pay went from $22 an hour to $10 an hour. To protect their incomes, many workers choose to work during their recovery from injury, in some cases causing further damage and pain.

Anti-union efforts 

A California judge ruled in September 2019 that Tesla and Elon Musk had illegally sabotaged employee efforts to form a union. Union organizers voiced concerns about high injury rates and low wages. Organizers were illegally harassed by Tesla security guards, threatened with losing benefits such as stock options, and warned by supervisors that they could be fired. Tesla fired one employee, Richard Ortiz, who had been active in union organization efforts. In May 2021, the National Labor Relations Board upheld the 2019 court ruling, ordering that Ortiz be reinstated with back pay and that Musk delete an anti-union tweet.

In June 2022, a CNBC report found that Tesla paid MikeWorldWide to monitor a Tesla employee Facebook group and to conduct research on Tesla union organizers on social media from 2017 to 2018. MikeWorldWide monitored discussions on social networks alleging unfair labor practices at Tesla and monitored discussions on a sexual harassment lawsuit. Former and current Tesla employees told CNBC that they believe the company continues to monitor its workers on social media.

Child labor in supply chain 
In 2020, The Times noted Tesla's dependence on cobalt from the Democratic Republic of Congo in their lithium-ion car batteries, which have been called "blood batteries" due to incidents of child labor and extremely poor working conditions. Tesla stated in 2020 that it is moving to cobalt-free batteries without giving a timeline. In the January–March 2022 quarter, half of Tesla's car batteries were cobalt-free.

Sweatshop conditions 
In December 2020, PingWest highlighted poor working conditions at Giga Shanghai, calling it "Giga-Sweatshop". Employees reported being "crammed into tight workspace", intense manual labor, and office bullying. Many employees at Giga Shanghai quit after Tesla cancelled employee stock options and failed to keep its promise of paying an overtime allowance.

The working conditions at Tesla's Fremont factory were criticized in 2021 by former Tesla worker Dennis Duran, who called it a "modern-day industrial sweatshop".

Workplace culture issues

Racism and harassment 

Tesla has faced numerous complaints over workplace harassment and racial discrimination, with one former Tesla worker who attempted to sue the employer describing it as "a hotbed of racist behavior". As of December 2020, only four percent of leadership at the company are African American and seventeen percent are women. A former black worker described the work environment at Tesla's Buffalo plant as a "very racist place". Tesla and SpaceX's treatment of Juneteenth in 2020 also came under fire.

Approximately 100 former employees have submitted signed statements alleging that Tesla discriminates specifically against African Americans and "allows a racist environment in its factories." Furthermore, in July 2021, former employee Melvin Berry received $1 million in his discrimination case in arbitration against Tesla after he claimed he was referred to by the n-word and forced to work longer hours at the Fremont plant. In October 2021, a jury found Tesla liable for the racial harassment of Owen Diaz at its Fremont facility during 2015–2016 and a total damage of $15 million by subsequent ruling of a judge.

The accusations of racism culminated in February 2022 with the California Department of Fair Employment and Housing suing Tesla for "discriminating against its Black workers." A further lawsuit regarding racism was raised by fifteen former and current employees in June 2022.

Sexual harassment 
In 2021, seven women came forward with claims of having faced sexual harassment and discrimination while working at Tesla's Fremont factory. They accused the company of facilitating a culture of rampant sexual harassment. According to their filings and subsequent interviews, the women were consistently subjected to catcalling, unwanted advances, unwanted touching, and discrimination while at work. One of the seven, Brooks, told The Washington Post that "I was so tired of the unwanted attention and the males gawking at me I proceeded to create barriers around me just so I could get some relief" and "[t]hat was something I felt necessary just so I can do my job." Their stories range from intimate groping to being called out to the parking lot for sex. Each of the women feared calling Human Resources for help as their supervisors were often participants. Musk himself is not accused directly, but most of the women pressing charges believe their abuse is connected to the behavior of CEO Musk. They cited his crude remarks about women's bodies, wisecracks about starting a university that abbreviated to "T.IT.S", and his generally dismissive attitude towards reporting sexual harassment. Attorney David A. Lowe, their legal representative, stated, "What we're addressing for each of the lawsuits is just a shocking pattern of rampant harassment that exists at Tesla".

In 2017 another woman accused Tesla of similar behavior and was subsequently fired. Her lawsuit was dismissed with prejudice in 2019.

Musk's work behavior 
Musk has been criticized for his erratic behavior. The Wall Street Journal reported in 2017 that, after Musk insisted on branding his vehicles as "self-driving", he faced criticism from his engineers, some of them resigning in response, and one highlighting Musk's "reckless decision making that has potentially put customer lives at risk". In 2018, Tesla board members expressed concern regarding Musk's use of Ambien and recreational drugs. Wired noted in 2018 that Musk was known amongst employees for his "unpredictable rages", and Tesla employees were warned not to walk past Musk's desk because he was so prone to unexpectedly firing people. Ex-employees said in 2019 that Musk would change the direction of the company "literally overnight" based on what was making news on social media. Several professors in 2018 and 2019  noted Musk's narcissistic tendencies, and the problems this could cause for Tesla.

Turnover rate 
In 2019, Tesla was criticized for its high level of executive turnover compared to other technology companies. With the departure of William Berry in March 2022, Tesla had five general counsel departures since 2018. Several lower level lawyers in the company, such as deputy general counsels, have also left in 2021 and 2022.

Relationship with the media industry 
Musk has openly criticized the media while Tesla famously dissolved its public relations department in 2020.

Distracting from bad news 
Reporter Michael Hiltzik has argued that Musk has a habit of promoting good news "relentlessly" about Tesla and himself, while creating sideshows to distract followers away from any bad news. In particular, Hiltzik pointed out that Tesla's announcement in February 2021 that it was investing $1.5 billion in Bitcoin coincided with news that the Chinese government had rebuked Tesla for poor quality control and consumer relations in China, as well as a report that the company's German factory (Giga Berlin) was facing construction delays and reduced government subsidies. Similarly, in July 2018, Bloomberg News reported that Elon Musk enlisted the help of the head of the Sierra Club specifically to deflect criticism over his donations to Republicans.

Dispute over facts 
Musk has repeatedly disputed accounts provided by Tesla founder Martin Eberhard about Tesla's early history, and reached a settlement to be able to call himself a co-founder of Tesla despite not being one of the two founders.

In 2020, the Environmental Protection Agency publicly denied a claim made by Musk that the agency made a mistake when testing the Model S sedan's mileage rating.

New York Times test drive dispute 
In early 2013, Tesla approached the New York Times to publish a story "Focused on future advancements in our Supercharger technology". In February 2013, the Times published an account on the newly installed Supercharger network on freeway between Boston and New York City. The author describes fundamental flaws in the Model S sedan, primarily that the range was severely lowered in the below-freezing temperatures of the American Northeast. At one point the vehicle died completely and needed to be towed to a charging station.

After the story was published, Tesla stock dipped 3%. Three days later, Musk responded with a series of tweets, calling the article "fake", and followed up with a lengthy blog post disputing several of the article's claims. He called it a "salacious story" and provided data, annotated screenshots and maps obtained from recording equipment installed in the press vehicle as evidence that the New York Times had fabricated much of the story.In a statement, the Times stood by the accuracy of the story, calling it "completely factual". Author John Broder quickly issued a rebuttal in which he clarified and rejected many of the accusations made by Musk.During further investigation by the media, Musk said "the Model S battery never ran out of energy at any time, including when Broder called the flatbed truck." Auto blog Jalopnik contacted Rogers Automotive & Towing, the towing company Broder used. Their records showed that "the car's battery pack was completely drained." In his follow-up blog post, Broder said "The car's display screen said the car was shutting down, and it did. The car did not have enough power to move, or even enough to release the electrically operated parking brake."

In the days that followed, NYT public editor Margaret Sullivan published an opinion piece titled "Problems With Precision and Judgment, but Not Integrity, in Tesla Test". She concludes, "In the matter of the Tesla Model S and its now infamous test drive, there is still plenty to argue about and few conclusions that are unassailable." No legal action was pursued.

Promotion of bitcoin
Tesla and Elon Musk have supported and promoted the cryptocurrency bitcoin. Tesla began accepting bitcoin as a form of payment for its products in March 2021, but reversed its decision in May 2021. Tesla and Musk have been criticized as being hypocritical, since Tesla markets itself as a sustainable and environmentally friendly company, while bitcoin is environmentally unfriendly due to the large amount of energy required to "mine" new bitcoin.

After the company stopped accepting bitcoin for car payments, on May 12, 2021, Musk stated on Twitter that "Tesla will not be selling any Bitcoin", which was, at the end of 2021, worth nearly $2 billion. In July 2022, Tesla stated in regulatory filings that it sold approximately 75% of its bitcoin in the March–June 2022 quarter.

Musk has also been accused of market manipulation by using his Twitter presence to pump up the price of bitcoin and dogecoin.

Compliance with open source license agreements 
Prior to 2018, Tesla used modified versions of the Linux kernel and BusyBox in their vehicles without freely distributing the derivative software and its corresponding source code, which is mandatory under the licensing terms of these products, the GNU General Public License (GPL).

From 2013 to 2018, a number of complaints were made to the Software Freedom Conservancy (SFC), which privately attempted to negotiate compliance before pursuing litigation against Tesla. They announced in 2018 that Tesla achieved partial compliance and had promised to release more of their modifications in the future. As of late 2019, the SFC claims that Tesla has not yet delivered on this promise.

See also 
 List of lawsuits involving Tesla
 TSLAQ
 Elon Musk's Crash Course

References

Further reading 

 
 

Tesla, Inc.
Tesla, Inc.